Dennis Feltham Jones  (15 July 1918 – 1 April 1981) was a British science fiction author who published under the name D.F. Jones. He was a Royal Navy commander during World War II and lived in Cornwall.

His first novel, Colossus (1966), about a defence super computer which uses its control over nuclear weapons to subjugate mankind, was made into the feature film Colossus: The Forbin Project (1970).

Bibliography

Novels 

 Colossus series:
 Colossus (1966)
 The Fall of Colossus (1974)
 Colossus and the Crab (1977)
 Implosion (1967)
 Don't Pick the Flowers, or Denver is Missing (1971)
 The Floating Zombie (1975)
 Xeno, or Earth Has Been Found (1979)
 Bound in Time (1981)

Short stories 

 "Coffee Break" (1968)
 "Black Snowstorm" (1969)
 "The Tocsin" (1970)

Adaptations 

 Colossus: The Forbin Project (1970), film directed by Joseph Sargent, based on his novel Colossus

See also
 Colossus computer

References

External links
 Fantastic Fiction
 SF Site
 
 Jones, D. F. at The Encyclopedia of Science Fiction

British science fiction writers
Royal Navy officers of World War II
1918 births
1981 deaths
20th-century British novelists
Officers of the Order of the British Empire
British male novelists